Piratula is a genus of wolf spiders  first circumscribed in 1960. Its 26 species are found mainly in Asia, with a few found in Europe and North America.

Species 
The following species are recognised in the genus Piratula:
 Piratula borea (Tanaka, 1974) — Russia, China, Japan
 Piratula canadensis (Dondale & Redner, 1981) — Russia, Canada
 Piratula cantralli (Wallace & Exline, 1978) — USA, Canada
 Piratula clercki (Bösenberg & Strand, 1906) — China, Korea, Taiwan, Japan
 Piratula denticulata (Liu, 1987) — Russia, China, Taiwan
 Piratula gigantea (Gertsch, 1934) — USA
 Piratula hiroshii (Tanaka, 1986) — Japan
 Piratula hokkaidensis (Tanaka, 2003) — Japan
 Piratula hurkai (Buchar, 1966) — Ukraine, Russia, Georgia, Abkhazia
 Piratula hygrophila (Thorell, 1872) — Palearctic
 Piratula insularis (Emerton, 1885) — Holarctic
 Piratula iriomotensis (Tanaka, 1989) — Ryukyu Islands
 Piratula knorri (Scopoli, 1763) — Palearctic
 Piratula latitans (Blackwall, 1841) — Europe to Azerbaijan
 Piratula logunovi Omelko, Marusik & Koponen, 2011 — Russia
 Piratula longjiangensis (Yan et al., 1997) — China
 Piratula meridionalis (Tanaka, 1974) — China, Korea, Japan
 Piratula minuta (Emerton, 1885) — North America
 Piratula montigena (Liu, 1987) — China
 Piratula piratoides (Bösenberg & Strand, 1906) — Russia, Korea, China, Japan
 Piratula procurva (Bösenberg & Strand, 1906) — China, Korea, Japan
 Piratula raika Zamani & Marusik, 2021 — Iran
 Piratula serrulata (Song & Wang, 1984) — Russia, China
 Piratula tanakai (Brignoli, 1983) — Russia, Korea, Japan
 Piratula tenuisetacea (Chai, 1987) — China
 Piratula uliginosa (Thorell, 1856) — Europe, Russia (Europe to West Siberia)
 Piratula yaginumai (Tanaka, 1974) — Russia, China, Korea, Japan
 Piratula yesoensis (Tanaka, 1985) — Japan

See also 
 List of Lycosidae genera

References 

Lycosidae
Araneomorphae genera
Spiders of Asia
Spiders of North America
Taxa named by Carl Friedrich Roewer